Semaphorin-4G is a protein that in humans is encoded by the SEMA4G gene.

Semaphorins are a large family of conserved secreted and membrane associated proteins which possess a semaphoring (Sema) domain and a PSI domain (found in plexins, semaphorins and integrins) in the N-terminal extracellular portion. Based on sequence and structural similarities, semaphorins are put into eight classes: invertebrates contain classes 1 and 2, viruses have class V, and vertebrates contain classes 3-7. Semaphorins serve as axon guidance ligands via multimeric receptor complexes, some (if not all) containing plexin proteins. This gene encodes a class 4 semaphorin. This gene and the gene for mitochondrial ribosomal protein L43 overlap at map location 10q24.31 and are transcribed in opposite directions.

References

Further reading